Calcutta is an unincorporated community in Clay County, Indiana, United States.

History
Calcutta was founded in 1870 as a coal town. A post office was established at Calcutta in 1870, and remained in operation until it was discontinued in 1879.

References

Unincorporated communities in Clay County, Indiana
Unincorporated communities in Indiana